Nikolas James Needham (born November 4, 1996) is an American football cornerback for the Miami Dolphins of the National Football League (NFL). He played college football at UTEP.

College career
Needham was a member of the UTEP Miners for five seasons, redshirting his freshman season. He finished his collegiate career with 213 tackles, 13.5 tackles for loss and three interceptions and a school record 33 passes broken up in 41 games played.

Professional career

Needham signed with the Miami Dolphins as an undrafted free agent on April 28, 2019. He was waived on August 31, 2019, as part of final roster cuts but was resigned to the team's practice squad the following day. Needham was promoted to the active roster on October 12, 2019, and made his NFL debut the next day against the Washington Redskins, starting at cornerback and finishing the game with one tackle and a pass defended.
In week 9 against the New York Jets, Needham recorded a team high 9 tackles and sacked Sam Darnold once in the 26–18 win. Needham recorded his first career interception on November 10, 2019, against the Indianapolis Colts, picking off a pass from Brian Hoyer in the fourth quarter of the Dolphins' 16-12 win.
In week 15 against the New York Giants, Needham intercepted a pass thrown by Eli Manning during the 36–20 loss. Needham finished his rookie season with 54 tackles, a sack, one forced fumble and a team-high 11 passes defended with two interceptions in 12 games played.

In Week 10 of the 2020 season against the Los Angeles Chargers, Needham recorded his first sack of the season on Justin Herbert during the 29–21 win.

Needham was given an exclusive-rights free agent tender by the Dolphins on March 8, 2021. He signed the one-year contract on April 19.

On March 11, 2022, the Dolphins placed a second-round restricted free agent tender on Needham.

On October 19, 2022, the Dolphins placed Needham on injured reserve.

On March 17, 2023, Needham re-signed with the Dolphins.

References

External links
UTEP Miners bio
Miami Dolphins bio

1996 births
Living people
American football defensive backs
UTEP Miners football players
Miami Dolphins players
People from Buena Park, California
Players of American football from California
Sportspeople from Orange County, California